The Chief Maqoma Regiment (formerly Prince Alfred's Guard)  is a reserve infantry regiment of the South African Army. The regiment is located in the city of Port Elizabeth.

History

Origin
Chief Maqoma Regiment was established on 19 September 1856 as the Port Elizabeth Volunteer Rifle Corps. In 1860 the title Prince Alfred's Guard was assumed unofficially (after Prince Alfred, Duke of Edinburgh) and on 11 July 1874 this name was officially sanctioned as Prince Alfred's Volunteer Guard. The name was later changed to Prince Alfred's Guard.

Xhosa Wars
The regiment first saw action on 2 December 1877, against the Gcaleka tribesmen in the Battle of Umzintzani during the Ninth Xhosa War. The next conflict that the unit participated in was the Basutoland Campaign of 1880 to 1881, during which a 500-metre bayonet charge by the regiment which led to the capture of the village of Lerotholi, an enemy village. The regiment also took part in the Bechuanaland Campaign of 1897.

Anglo Boer War
The regiment also served in the Second Anglo-Boer War of 1899 to 1902 - as mounted infantry - and took part in campaigns in the Orange Free State and the South African Republic.

World War One
Members of the unit volunteered for service in World War I, but there was dissension in the ranks after a long deployment on sentry duty in Cape Town. As a result, the contingent was disbanded and most of its members saw active service during the war in other South African units.

With the Union Defence Force
In 1913 the regiment was redesignated the 3rd Infantry Regiment (Prince Alfred's Guard) of the Active Citizen Force of the Union Defence Force, but regained its former name in 1934.

World War Two
During World War II, the regiment first served as link battalion for the 2nd Brigade, South African Infantry in North Africa, sending drafts of men to the fighting units, among which many went to the Field Force Battalion.

Armour
The PAG was subsequently converted to an armoured unit and saw further active service with the 11th South African Armoured Brigade, South African 6th Armoured Division in Italy as a tank unit.
On 20 April 1944, equipped with Mark V Shermans and Stuarts, the regiment landed at Taranto in the heel of Italy. They were to reinforce the Allies still trapped at Anzio, and worn out by bitter fighting at Cassino and along the Gustav line.

With the SADF

Bush War and South West Africa (Namibia)
Re-equipped with Eland-90 armoured cars in the postwar period, the PAG also took part in several skirmishes during subsequent border conflicts in Angola and South-West Africa (Namibia).

Post 1994 and the SANDF
The PAG was converted to a reserve infantry regiment in the SANDF. Its members are currently trained to a large extent as air assault infantry.

Name Change
In August 2019, 52 Reserve Force units had their names changed to reflect the diverse military history of South Africa. The Prince Alfred's Guard became the Chief Maqoma Regiment, and have 3 years to design and implement new regimental insignia.

Regimental Symbols
The Prince Alfred's Guard Museum in Port Elizabeth houses military exhibits in the Regiment's Victorian Drill Hall (built in 1880). It is a national monument and one of the finest surviving examples of its type.

Insignia

Previous Dress Insignia

Current Dress Insignia

Battle honours

Gaika Gcaleka 1877, Transkei 1877 - 1878, Umzintzani, Basutoland 1880 - 1881, Bechuanaland 1897, South Africa 1899 - 1902, Italy 1944 - 1945,  Celleno, Florence, The Greve, Gothic Line, Po Valley

Leadership

Alliances
 - The Royal Highland Fusiliers

See also

Prince Alfred's Guard Memorial
Donkin Heritage Trail

Books

References

External links

 Nelson Mandela Bay Museums

Infantry regiments of South Africa
Military units and formations established in 1856
Military units and formations in Port Elizabeth
Military units and formations of the British Empire
Military units and formations of the Second Boer War